James William McGhee (April 28, 1882 – August 6, 1968) was an inventor of the drapery hook. He was also a manufacturer, prospector, carpenter, contractor, and interior design specialist.

Early years
He was born in Eminence, Kentucky and by 1918 he was living in Los Angeles working as a piano salesman for the Garr Piano Company. He married Edna Mae Louis, and they had two children: George Louis McGhee (1925–2000) and Barbara Ann McGhee (1923– ).

Inventions
On November 27, 1923, he was issued a patent for a drapery hook. He co-founded McGhee and Jinks Manufacturing Co. in Los Angeles where he manufactured the hooks, rings, and other drapery hardware. The drapery hook keeps the draperies attached to the traverse tracks and drapery rods.

Infringement
Patent 1475306 was the subject of an infringement lawsuit that McGhee lost and appealed. He lost again on appeal when the United States Court of Appeals for the Ninth Circuit found that hook designs were not patentable in 1929:
 With the lower court, we fail to find in plaintiffs' device any patentable novelty; certainly there is no invention in the hook member. Hooks of all shapes and materials are among the commonest things of life. In size, strength, and shape they are to be adapted to needs and tastes, and the adaptation of a hook to suit the pole, rod, bar, or rings from which the drapery is to hang is readily made by any person of common intelligence. There is no invention.

Death
His death was due to heart complications. He died August 6, 1968, aged 86, at the county hospital in San Bernardino, California. He was survived by his children George L. McGhee and actress Maria Hart.

References

Patents
 on March 23, 1920
 on January 10, 1922
 on November 27, 1923 
 on December 30, 1924

External links
Dominion of Canada patent number 246361

1882 births
1968 deaths
20th-century American inventors